La Tigra is a district of the San Carlos canton, in the Alajuela province of Costa Rica.

History 
La Tigra was created on 5 February 1952 by Decreto Ejecutivo 15.

Geography 
La Tigra has an area of  km² and an elevation of  metres.

It is located in the northern region of the country and limits to the north with Florencia, to the south with San Ramón, to the east with Florencia and San Ramón.

Its head, the village of La Tigra, is located 27.9 km (48 minutes) to the east of Ciudad Quesada and 108 km (2 hours 36 minutes) to the northwest of San José the capital of the nation.

It is located at an elevation range of between 200 and 1100 meters above sea level.

Demographics 

For the 2011 census, La Tigra had a population of  inhabitants.  It is the ninth most populated district of the canton.

Settlements 
La Tigra has 10  population centers:

La Tigra (head of the district)
Concepción
El Futuro
San José
San Pedro
San Isidro
San Miguel
San Rafael
La Lucha
San Gerardo

Economy 
The production of ornamental plants became, over the years, one of the main productive activities of this district, where the climate and the land lend themselves to the cultivation of large variety of species of export like dracaenas, Indian cane, orchids, deremensis, between others.

In addition to the plants, crops such as cassava, the ñampí, the tiquizque and the banana are planted, among others.

In turn, the arrival of tourism is glimpsed with the Bosque Eterno de Los Niños, which owns a rainforest with a great diversity of plants and animals that give life to the place.

Transportation

Road transportation 
The district is covered by the following road routes:
 National Route 141
 National Route 702
 National Route 738

References 

Districts of Alajuela Province
Populated places in Alajuela Province